Paradise River, formerly , was an aerodrome located near the community of Paradise River on the Labrador Peninsula in Newfoundland and Labrador, Canada.

References

Defunct airports in Newfoundland and Labrador